Palatovo is a rural locality (a selo) and the administrative center of Palatovskoye Rural Settlement, Krasnogvardeysky District, Belgorod Oblast, Russia. The population was 924 as of 2010. There are 17 streets.

Geography 
Palatovo is located 43 km southwest of Biryuch (the district's administrative centre) by road. Podles is the nearest rural locality.

References 

Rural localities in Krasnogvardeysky District, Belgorod Oblast